This is a list of cities in Flanders, the northern part of Belgium. The status of "city" is historical and does not necessarily mean it has a high number of inhabitants: see city status in Belgium for more information.

Brussels is not listed because it is not part of the Flemish Region; it is however included in the Flemish Community.

See also
 City status in Belgium
 List of cities in Belgium
 List of cities in Wallonia
 List of municipalities of the Flemish Region

Populated places in Flanders
Flanders